Blumine Island /  is an island in the outer reaches of Queen Charlotte Sound / Tōtaranui, in the Marlborough Sounds at the northern end of New Zealand's South Island.

The New Zealand Ministry for Culture and Heritage gives a translation of "meeting place of spirits" for Ōruawairua.

Description
It is the site of a scenic reserve meaning anyone can visit the island. A visit by Captain James Cook left the island infested with introduced pests, which have since been eradicated through the use of helicopter poison drops, conducted by the Department of Conservation. In May 2008 the island was declared predator free and efforts began to reintroduce native species back to the island.

During World War II, two gun emplacements were built on the island by soldiers and workmen from the Public Works Department. This was to protect a planned American Navy anchorage in the Marlborough Sounds from a feared Japanese invasion. The sites were abandoned in 1945 towards the end of the war. In 2012, walking tracks were built, connecting the island's main campsite with the emplacements.

Blumine Island hosts Outward Bound and Untouched World Charitable Trust who help in the maintenance of the island.

Kiwi
On 29 June 2010, three pairs of the rarest kiwi, rowi kiwi were released onto the island.

See also

 List of islands of New Zealand
 List of islands
 Desert island

References

Uninhabited islands of New Zealand
Islands of the Marlborough Sounds
Protected areas of the Marlborough Region